Lighting Up the Sky is the eighth and final studio album by American rock band Godsmack. It was released on February 24, 2023, five years after their last studio album When Legends Rise, making it the longest gap between two studio albums by Godsmack.

Background 

While on tour promoting When Legends Rise, news of a follow-up to the album began circulating as early as August 2019 when frontman Sully Erna revealed in an interview with Canada's iHeartRadio that the band has been preparing to begin the songwriting process for the album. Several months later, in a video message dated March 23, 2020, and shared via the Twitter account of SiriusXM, drummer Shannon Larkin and lead guitarist Tony Rambola confirmed the band has been writing music for the album. Shortly after, and during an appearance on Sirius XM Radio's Trunk Nation, Sully Erna admitted that, while his band has been compiling some ideas, he was lacking the inspiration to write anything. Nonetheless, he assured the fans that the new album would be finished sooner than later:

In a May 4, 2021, appearance on The VR Sessions' "Riff On It", Sully Erna revealed that the band has written 12 songs for the album in just three weeks, and that the band was in the process of writing the lyrics and laying down all the melodies. in an April 23, 2022, interview with WJRR, Sully Erna said that the band had recorded the new album with a new single expected to hit the airwaves in mid-to-late summer and that the album could be the band's last. 

While being interviewed by Pablo of the Minneapolis, Minnesota radio station 93X, Sully Erna confirmed that Lighting Up the Sky would indeed be Godsmack's last body of work but went on to clarify that the band will not be retiring from performing or touring after this album. In an Instagram video posted to Sully's own account on October 10, 2022, he further assured the fans that the band members "are getting along better than ever" and that they "plan on continuing to tour" long after the album has been released, with a greatest hits-style of touring being planned for the future. Erna later clarified that it would be the band's last "unless we just decide one day, 'Yeah, one more for the road.'"

Composition and themes 
Sully Erna described the sound of Lighting Up the Sky as "high-voltage, high-energy, hard rock album, packed with melodies, packed with good hooks, big grooves, great guitar solos." He said that it's a "true hard rock record" that's worthy of being the band's last studio album. Lighting Up the Sky is co-produced by frontman Sully Erna and record producer Andrew Murdock, who is best known for producing the band's first two multi-platinum studio albums Godsmack and Awake, as well as for his work with Avenged Sevenfold and Alice Cooper.

Like its predecessors, Lighting Up the Sky is based on Sully Erna's own personal life experiences as he stated during an interview with Audacy: 
Elaborating further, he revealed that the title track itself is about him looking back at his journey, reflecting on it, and that if he could go back in time, what he would do differently and what advice he would give his younger self. He did, however, admit that none of that was planned, but rather "this really kind of mystical thing happened" where he felt "the universe wrote this record."

Promotion 
To promote the album, Godsmack released their first single in four years titled "Surrender" on September 28, 2022. The day after, the band held a private listening party  at the Circa Resort & Casino in Las Vegas, Nevada. During the listening party which was attended by roughly sixty radio and media personnel, the band played five songs from the album while frontman Sully Erna talked about the writing and recording process for each one.

On November 11, 2022, the band released "You and I" as the second single from the album.

Commercial performance 
Lighting Up the Sky debuted at number nineteen on the US Billboard 200, and No. 1 on the US Top Hard Rock Albums chart with 21,000 album-equivalent units, of which 18,000 were pure album sales, and 3,000 were streaming units. The album also debuted Top-10 in Austria, and Germany. Surrender, the albums lead single peaked No. 1 on the Billboard Mainstream Rock Airplay chart in November of 2022.

Track listing

Personnel 
Godsmack
 Sully Erna – lead vocals, rhythm guitar, production (all tracks), Moog (track 1); acoustic guitar, drums, keyboards (5); background vocals, organ, piano (10)
 Tony Rombola – lead guitar (all tracks)
 Robbie Merrill – bass guitar
 Shannon Larkin – drums (1–4, 6–10)

Technical
Mudrock – production (1, 2, 4–10), co-production (3), engineering (all tracks)
Ted Jensen – mastering
Dave Fortman – mixing
Ai Fujisaki – engineering assistance
Chad Zuchegno – engineering assistance
Pat Rowe – engineering assistance

Charts

References 

2023 albums
Albums produced by Dave Fortman
Godsmack albums